Michael Rueben Nyambuya (born 23 July 1955) is a Zimbabwean politician and military officer who has served as Governor of Manicaland and as Minister of Energy and Power Development.

Military career  
Mike Nyambuya served in the Zimbabwean armed forces during the Second Congo War, and was in command of Zimbabwean forces defending N'Djili Airfield during Operation Kitona.

Political career
Nyambuya is a former army general. He served as Governor of Manicaland before being appointed as Minister of Energy and Power Development in mid-April 2005, following the March 2005 parliamentary election. He was placed on the United States sanctions list in 2005.

He was nominated as ZANU-PF's candidate for the House of Assembly seat from Mutasa North, a constituency in Manicaland, in the March 2008 parliamentary election. He was defeated in this election by David Anthony Chimhini, the candidate of the Movement for Democratic Change-Tsvangirai, receiving 4882 against 9396 for Chimhini.

The Herald reported on 3 January 2009 that Nyambuya had been dismissed from the Cabinet earlier in the week, along with 11 other ministers, because he no longer held any seat in Parliament.

References 

Living people
Government ministers of Zimbabwe
1955 births